Villefontaine is a commune in the Isère department in southeastern France.

Geography
The Bourbre flows northwest through the northeastern part of the commune.

Population

Twin towns – sister cities

Villefontaine is twinned with:
 Kahl am Main, Germany (1990)
 Bitterfeld-Wolfen, Germany (1994)
 Gremda, Tunisia (1994)
 Salzano, Italy (2009)

See also
Communes of the Isère department

References

External links
Official website

Communes of Isère
Isère communes articles needing translation from French Wikipedia